is a historical text that categorizes and chronologizes the events listed in the Six National Histories.

Notes

Late Old Japanese texts
History books about Japan
Heian period
12th-century Japanese books
History books of the Heian Period